Aaj Aur Kal (meaning 'today and tomorrow' in Hindi and Urdu) may refer to:

 Aaj Aur Kal (1963 film), an Indian Hindi film produced and directed by Vasant Joglekar
 Aaj Aur Kal (1947 film), an Indian Hindi film directed by Khwaja Ahmad Abbas
 Aaj Aur Kal (1976 film), Pakistani Urdu social film